Casanovva (also known as Confident Casanovva) is a 2012 Indian Malayalam-language romantic action thriller film directed by Rosshan Andrrews and written by Bobby & Sanjay. It was produced by Roy C. J. of Confident Group in association with Aashirvad Cinemas. It stars Mohanlal, Shriya Saran, Raai Laxmi, Roma Asrani, Sanjjanaa Galrani, Vikramjeet Virk, Abhishek Vinod, Arjun Nandhakumar, Shahid Shamzy, Jagathi Sreekumar, Lalu Alex, Riyaz Khan and Shankar Panicker. The film features original soundtrack composed by Gopi Sundar, Alphons Joseph, and Gowry Lekshmi, and a film score composed by Sundar.

Produced on a budget of  12 crore, it was one of the most expensive Malayalam films ever made at that time. Confidant Casanovva was released in India on 26 January 2012.

Plot
The film is about Casanovva, a billionaire playboy, the owner of Casanovva's Eternal Spring, an international chain of flower boutiques. He has at his beck and call a faithful array of female followers including his staff, friends and former girlfriends, who will do anything for him. The film starts with a robbery carried out by four criminals and they decide their next target in a wedding hall. They enter the wedding place as Casanovva's guests. Casanovva recognises them but allows them to attend the marriage function having some plan in his mind. The young criminals (Alexi, Salim, Arjun, Kiran) take some photos of their targeted rich persons and collect their details. Casanovva watches all this and does not respond at the moment.

The next day is the wedding ceremony. Casanovva, with the aid of his friend in a TV channel (without revealing his plan), plans a live telecast programme to capture the four criminal's robbery. But unfortunately, the wedding is postponed due to some unexpected reasons. Thus the robbers pull out from their plan. But within this time the TV channel people come for the telecast. Suddenly Casanovva gets an idea and announces a new live romance reality show through the channel named FALL IN LOVE. Then he creates some plans to make the two people in the robbery gang to fall in love with Hanna and Ann Mary and telecast their love scenes using hidden cameras through the live reality show FALL IN LOVE. Hanna falls for one of the young robber by hearing the words of Casanovva, who was her boss. The four robbers try to steal a sword, but casanovva (wearing a mask in face) interrupts them and takes the sword from them. By this time, the TV show became popular and causes some problems to Ann Mary, the robbers and even Hanna. Hanna asks her boss Casanovva what his plan was. So Casanovva reveals his flashback to Hanna.

Some years ago, Casanovva came to Dubai and romances some girls. Zacariah who is a magazine reporter publishes the stories of Casanovva and him mingling with girls. Sameera Zacharia, daughter of Zacharia helps Casanovva from a danger and eventually they become friends. During a meeting with Casanovva on the last day of his holiday in Dubai Sameera falls for him and believed his feelings for her is also real. But when Casanovva returns to Europe he again started to flirt with ladies and forgot sameera who is still waiting fir Casanovva. Next year Casanovva again came to Dubai for holiday this time an angry and jealous sameera decides to make Casanovva feel the tension and pain that she had gone through the past year because of Casanovva's flirtious life. Sameera lies to him that she has a lover which made Casanovva jealous. Casanovva is surprised by Sameera's nature and realize that she is different from other women with whom he had relations. Gradually Casanovva understands that he has some different feeling for Sameera than other women. He realises that he is in love with her. She also has love interest in Casanovva. But her father requests Casanovva to leave his daughter. He replies that he was in love with his daughter. Casanovva calls Sameera for a meeting to reveal his love to her. On the day, at A Big Fair in Dubai, Sameera wears a mask to give Casanovva a surprise. But suddenly four robbers rush to the road with the same mask as Sameera. The police try to capture them. The four robbers escape and Sameera is caught by the police. And one of the robber shoots Sameera and she dies at the spot. Casanovva waits for her and returns to his room depressed. On the way, he sees the four robbers escaping in a car. But at that time he had no idea about the incident that had happened. He is informed of the death of Sameera by TV news in his room. He rushes to the police to tell about the robbers. But they don't listen to Casanovva. Here ends the Flashback.

He says to Hanna that the aim of the reality show was to make the robbers understand about the feeling of love. He then captures the robbers and makes them explain that Sameera was not their gang member to public through the TV show. Thus Casanovva succeeds in showing the innocence of his lover Sameera to the public and police. Then he asks the robbers who killed Sameera. They reveals that it was nobody else than Alexi. Alexi reveals that he killed Sameera and when she got arrested he thought that she was one of his gang and she will reveal their plan to the police. Soon after, revealing the truth the police arrives at the place. Alexi runs away and Casanova follows him. Casanovva kills Alexi with a gun thereby avenging Sameera's death and surrenders to the police.

Cast

 Mohanlal as Casanovva
 Shriya Saran as Sameera Zacharia
 Raai Laxmi as Hanna
 Roma Asrani as Ann Mary
 Sanjjanaa Galrani as Nidhi
 Vikramjeet Virk as Alexi Joshua
 Abhishek Vinod as Arjun
 Arjun Nandhakumar as Kiran
 Shahid Shamzy as Saleem
 Jagathi Sreekumar as Luka
 Andria D'Souza as Mariam Thomas
 Lalu Alex as Zachariah
 Shankar Panicker as Ajay
 Riyaz Khan as Joseph
 Sagar S Nair as Super model
 Dimple Rose as Rose
 Shilpa Bala

Production
The film's production was launched at Confident Cascade in Bangalore on 24 January 2009. The event was attended by film personalities including Mohanlal, Vishnuvardhan, Jagathy Sreekumar, Lalu Alex, Arya, Arshad Warsi, Lakshmi Rai, Priyanka Nair, Priyadarshan, Sibi Malayil, Suresh Kumar, P. V. Gangadharan, Antony Perumbavoor, and the film unit members.

Filming
Confidant Casanovva started its shooting on 27 September 2010 and was scheduled to release in February 2011. However, the film has faced delays and its release date might be postponed. The first schedule was scheduled to finish in Dubai by 12 December 2010. It has been reported that Mohanlal is giving prime importance to another film, China Town, which is leading Casanovva to a delayed release. The second schedule has started from the last week of April 2011 in Dubai. The shooting at Dubai has ended by the first week of May 2011 and the next location is Bangkok will start shooting from 14 September, Fourth schedule Start shooting from 20 October at Bangalore, The remaining song was shot in the Last schedule that commenced from 12 December at Cape Town, South Africa.

Release

Confidant Casanovva released theatres in India on 26 January 2012; 138 theatres in Kerala and 64 theatres outside Kerala making it the widest release for a Malayalam film, with simultaneous opening in Mumbai, Chennai, Bangalore and other Indian cities. The film released overseas in February 2012.

Reception

Critical response
The film received negative reviews from critics.
 Moviebuzz from Sify called the film as "below average" while commented that "Casanovva perhaps has some nice moments but you would need real patience to spot them".
 Nowrunning.com rated , describing the movie as a "wish-wash film".
 Rediff gave the movie  and said that "Casanovva disappoints big time".
 Metromatinee.com review said "if Casanovva works even just a bit, it's because of Mohanlal".
 IndiaGlitz.com called the film as "a stylish flick" and said that "Casanovva is one film that may satisfy the fans of the star and those who like technically sound, slickly made films".
 Oneindia.in said "Even the glamorous looking babes in short and skimpy clothes could not save Casanovva from the disastrous plot of the film".

Sify and Rediff listed Casanovva #1 in their lists of Most Disappointing Malayalam Films of 2012.

Box office
The film had a large opening, collecting  2 crore, thanks to the 1,000 first-day shows, the highest ever for a Malayalam movie. However, as word of mouth spread, the collections tanked in the subsequent days. The film grossed above 8cr from worldwide boxoffice.

Soundtrack

The soundtrack features four songs composed by Gopi Sundar, Alphons Joseph and Gowry Lekshmi, with lyrics by Gireesh Puthenchery, Vayalar Sarath Chandra Varma, Gowry Lekshmi, Rosshan and Sanjay. The background score of the film has been composed by Gopi Sundar.

References

External links
 
 

2010s Malayalam-language films
Indian romance films
Films shot in Dubai
Films shot in Bangkok
Films scored by Alphons Joseph
Films directed by Rosshan Andrrews
Films scored by Gopi Sundar
Films scored by Gowry Lekshmi
Aashirvad Cinemas films